The Texas House of Representatives' 100th District represents a portion of the city of Dallas, in central Dallas County. The district includes part of downtown Dallas.

References 

100
Denton County, Texas